Nemours is an unincorporated community in Mercer County, West Virginia, United States. Nemours has a post office with ZIP code 24738.

Nemours was named after the primary employer in the town, E. I. du Pont de Nemours and Company, which had established a black powder mine in the town.

References

Unincorporated communities in Mercer County, West Virginia
Unincorporated communities in West Virginia